In superhero comic books, a team-up is a fictional crossover where two or more superheroes or superhero teams who usually do not appear together work together on a shared goal.

Overview
The first team-up between characters published in different comics from the same publisher was published in 1940 by the MLJ Comics. Pep Comics #4, by Harry Shorten and Irv Novick, featured a story with the Shield, which was continued in Top Notch Comics #5, by Will Harr and Edd Ashe. In that comic, the Shield met the Wizard. Timely Comics would follow, with a team-up between Sub-Mariner and Human Torch. National Comics Publications took the team-up concept one step further and created the Justice Society of America, the first superhero group, composed of superheroes who starred their own comic books. 

The team-up was an important worldbuilding narrative device, one that allowed for the creation of a shared universe concept.

Select comics with team-ups

A+X
Avenging Spider-Man
The Brave and the Bold
DC Comics Presents
Generations
Marvel Team-Up
Marvel Two-in-One
Superman/Batman
World's Finest Comics

In other media
Batman: The Brave and the Bold
Ultimate Spider-Man (TV series)

References 

Comics terminology